Currock is a southern suburb of Carlisle, Cumbria, England. It contains a boating lake. It had a bowling club until 2011.

References

Areas of Carlisle, Cumbria